The Royal tram stop is a tram stop in Wolverhampton, England. Opened on 31 May 1999, it is situated on West Midlands Metro Line 1. The stop is named after the Royal Hospital, which closed in 1997.

It is the only intermediate stop on the northern street-running stretch of the Midland Metro line, and is located in the central reservation of the A41 Bilston Road.

Services
Mondays to Fridays, Midland Metro services in each direction between Birmingham and Wolverhampton run at six to eight-minute intervals during the day, and at fifteen-minute intervals during the evenings and on Sundays. They run at eight minute intervals on Saturdays.

References

 Article about this stop on thetrams.co.uk

Transport in Wolverhampton
West Midlands Metro stops
Railway stations in Great Britain opened in 1999